Michael Brewster (born July 27, 1989) is a former American football center and current tight ends coach at Tennessee State. He played collegiality at the Ohio State University. Brewster was signed by the Jacksonville Jaguars as an undrafted free agent in 2012.

High school career
Brewster attended Edgewater High School in Orlando, Florida, where he played both sides of the ball, and was named All-State 6A in his senior season, 2007. Among his teammates were Greg Mathews and Ha Ha Clinton-Dix. Brewster also earned All-American honors by USA Today, Parade, and EA Sports. Regarded as a five-star prospect by Scout.com, Brewster was listed as the #1 center in the class of 2008.

College career
In his true freshman year, Brewster replaced the injured Jim Cordle at center, and his 49 consecutive starts is the 2nd longest streak at Ohio State and is one game shy of tying the all-time school record of 50. He was a Freshman All-American in 2008, First-team All-Big Ten, FWAA First-team All-American in 2010, and the only junior to be a finalist for the Rimmington Trophy.  In 2011, he was Second-team All-Big Ten in 2011, a Rimington Trophy candidate for the 2011–12 season, was named team captain by coach Luke Fickell, and was awarded the Jim Parker Award, as the team's outstanding offensive lineman.

Professional career

2012 NFL Draft
According to Sports Illustrated′s Tony Pauline, Brewster "would have been the first center drafted in the 2011 NFL Draft had he opted to enter." After his senior season at Ohio State, however, he was only projected as a late round pick and potential backup center. In their draft coverage, SI.com projected him as a fifth round pick.

Jacksonville Jaguars
On April 28, 2012, Brewster was signed by the Jacksonville Jaguars as an undrafted free agent. He earned his first NFL start in a game against the Indianapolis Colts in Week 3 of the 2012 season. He was placed on injured reserve on December 11, 2012, after breaking his left hand. Brewster was placed on injured reserve on December 16, 2013 after fracturing his left ankle. The Jaguars released Brewster on August 29, 2014.

Miami Dolphins
Brewster was signed to the Miami Dolphins' practice squad on November 11, 2014. He was released by the Dolphins on December 23, 2014.

New Orleans Saints
Brewster was signed to the New Orleans Saints' practice squad on December 26, 2014. He signed a futures contract with the Saints on December 29, 2014.

He participated in The Spring League in 2017.

Coaching career
Brewster began coaching high school football in 2017, at Lake Highland Prep and Orangewood Christian School.

Brewster joined Western Michigan and Bowling Green for the 2018 and 2019 season respectively as a graduate assistant.

Brewster then reuninted with former Ohio State football coach Luke Fickell at Cincinnati, beginning in 2020 on the defensive staff before shifting to offense in 2021.

In March of 2022, Brewster was hired as the tight ends coach at Tennessee State, working for former Ohio State great Eddie George.

References

External links
NFL Combine bio 
Ohio State Buckeyes bio 
 

1989 births
Living people
Players of American football from Orlando, Florida
American football offensive guards
American football centers
Ohio State Buckeyes football players
Jacksonville Jaguars players
The Spring League players